Streets of Ghost Town is a 1950 American Western film directed by Ray Nazarro and written by Barry Shipman. The film, reusing footage from the 1946 Durango Kid films Gunning for Vengeance and Landrush, stars Charles Starrett, George Chesebro, Mary Ellen Kay, Stanley Andrews, Frank Fenton, Don Reynolds, Ozie Waters and Smiley Burnette. The film was released on August 3, 1950, by Columbia Pictures.

Plot
Steve, Smiley and the Sheriff come to a ghost town to search for Bill Donner's gold. As they are menaced by persons unknown, Steve recounts the story of Donner and the deadly double cross. They are joined by Bill's daughter who is searching for her little brother who has come to claim the gold for himself.

Cast          
Charles Starrett as Steve Woods / The Durango Kid
George Chesebro as Bill Donner
Mary Ellen Kay as Doris Donner
Stanley Andrews as Sheriff Dodge
Frank Fenton as Bart Selby
Don Reynolds as Tommy Donner
Ozie Waters as Ozie
Smiley Burnette as Smiley Burnette

References

External links
 

1950 films
1950s English-language films
American Western (genre) films
1950 Western (genre) films
Columbia Pictures films
Films directed by Ray Nazarro
American black-and-white films
1950s American films